Phyllonorycter aceriphaga is a moth of the family Gracillariidae. It is known from Tajikistan and Turkmenistan.

The larvae feed on Acer turkestanicum. They probably mine the leaves of their host plant.

References

aceriphaga
Moths of Asia
Moths described in 1975